Winter games may refer to:

 Winter Games (1985 videogame), videogame by Epyx
 "Winter Games" (2PM song), 2013 song
 "Winter Games" (Theme song of 1988 Winter Olympics)
 Winter sports
 Winter Olympic Games
 Winter Paralympic Games
 Winter X Games
 Nordic Games
 Winter Games (album)

Other uses
 Game2: Winter, 2017 Russian reality television series
 Winter Universiade (Winter University Games)
 Winter Military World Games, see Military World Games
 World Scout Winter Games
 Winter Youth Olympics
 Special Olympics World Winter Games, see Special Olympics World Games
 Alberta Winter Games
 Asian Winter Games
 Arctic Winter Games
 BC Winter Games
 Canada Winter Games
 National Winter Games of China
 Commonwealth Winter Games
 Empire State Winter Games, see Empire State Games
 New Zealand Winter Games
 Quebec Winter Games, see Quebec Games
 Winter X Games Europe

See also
 Summer Games (disambiguation)
 Games (disambiguation)